Hillside High School is a mixed comprehensive secondary school located in Bootle, Merseyside. England.

History 
Hillside High School was formed in 1972 when Bootle Girls' Grammar School combined with
Balliol County Secondary School and was on two sites until 1987 when the new building at
Breeze Hill was completed.

Since then, facilities have been upgraded regularly.  All the Science laboratories have been upgraded. ICT facilities have expanded rapidly and the school has installed a state-of-the-art system of cabling to make the best possible use of the Sefton Learning Grid and broadband access to the worldwide web.

In September 2004 Hillside became a designated Specialist Science College and gained redesignation in summer 2008.

In September 2005 four new classrooms were opened for the teaching of Geography and RS, the
dining hall was extended to provide a suitable centre for the "Healthy School" Initiative, and two
existing classrooms were renovated and refurbished to provide an additional Science laboratory.

In the report by Ofsted, Hillside was graded as "Outstanding" overall in their 2007 inspection.

The school converted to academy status in March 2015 under the umbrella of the Wade Deacon Trust.

References 

Secondary schools in the Metropolitan Borough of Sefton
Academies in the Metropolitan Borough of Sefton
Bootle
Educational institutions established in 1972
1972 establishments in England